Narre Warren is a suburb in Melbourne, Victoria, Australia, 38 km southeast of Melbourne's Central Business District, located within the City of Casey local government area. Narre Warren recorded a population of 27,689 at the 2021 census.

Narre Warren has a population density of over 2000 people per square kilometre. Narre Warren has its own railway station, located on Webb Street, and is home to Australia's second largest shopping centre (by Gross Leasable Area), Westfield Fountain Gate, after Chadstone Shopping Centre. The biggest secondary school in Narre Warren is Fountain Gate Secondary College.

History

The original Main Street is some distance from present-day central Narre Warren, beside the railway line, causing development to occur away from the original settlement, and the building in which the general store also served as the post office, still exists as a local landmark, established 1857.
Narre Warren Post Office, located on what is now Heatherton Road, opened on 21 January 1869. In 1900 it was renamed Narre Warren North, and Narre Warren Railway Station Post Office (open since 1886) was renamed Narre Warren. The locale of Webb Street is named after Sydney James Webb, founder of a newsagency there.

Demographics

The most common ancestries in Narre Warren were Australian 21.9%, English 20.6%, Irish 5.1%, Scottish 5.1% and Indian 3.6%.
62.7% of people were born in Australia. The most common foreign countries of birth were India 3.6%, England 3.2%, Sri Lanka 2.7%, Afghanistan 1.9% and New Zealand 1.9%.
The most common responses for religion were Catholic 28.8%, No Religion 19.6%, Anglican 10.9%, Islam 5.6% and Buddhism 3.9%.
66.7% of people spoke only English at home. Other languages spoken at home included Dari 10%, Sinhalese 1.9%, Arabic 1.5%, Spanish 1.4% and Hindi 1.3%.

Residential development

Over the years Narre Warren has grown from a semi-rural residential town to become a part of a major growth corridor in the southeast of Melbourne.

In recent years, a multitude of new housing developments have seen Narre Warren expand to such an extent that it now adjoins neighbouring suburbs such as Berwick.

Education

Schools in Narre Warren include Harkaway Hills College, Lysterfield Lake College, Narre Warren North Primary School, Oatlands Primary School, Maramba Primary School, Don Bosco Primary School, Mary Mackillop Primary School, Fountain Gate Secondary College, Alkira Secondary College, Fountain Gate Primary School, Dandenong Valley Special School and Fleetwood Primary School (formerly known as Hallam Valley Primary School), Narre Warren South P-12 College and Waverley Christian College – Narre Warren South Campus. Narre Warren Station Primary School was closed at the end of 2001 and moved to Narre Warren South (to suit the change in growth areas) where it became Hillsmeade Primary School.  There is also a large community education centre, Narre Community Learning Centre Inc., located in Malcolm Court.

Community facilities

Kim Cang Temple, a Vietnamese Buddhist temple, is located in the suburb.

 The Narre Warren Football Club plays in the Outer East Football Netball League. It was formed in 1953 as Narre Hallam Football Club to serve Narre Warren and Hallam, and was a founding member of the South West Gippsland Football League in 1954. The club won premierships in 1957 and 1973. It was also runners-up in 1956, 1970, 1971, 1972 and 1981. In 1989 the club renamed itself the Narre Warren Football Club.

In 2004 Casey Panthers Soccer Team was founded with the home ground being Prospect Hill Reserve. The senior team compete in State League 5 competition. In 2022 the u17a team nicknamed the invincibles won the South East A grade and State A grade competitions and also the prestigious Polonia and Altona cups without losing a game. This was the only occurrence of this quadruple in Victorian soccer history.

Retail and civic development

Westfield Fountain Gate (named after one of the earlier subdivisions) is at the heart of the main commercial precinct in Narre Warren. It is one of the largest shopping centres in Australia, housing many of Australia's major retailers. The centre has been made famous by the popular Australian television show Kath & Kim, parts of which were also filmed at Westfield Southland.

There is also a local shopping strip around the railway station in Webb Street. The shopping strip includes stores such as bakeries, beauticians and a small supermarket.

The civic precinct is located outside the boundary of Westfield, and includes the City of Casey municipal offices, Narre Warren Library and the Casey ARC (Aquatic and Recreation Centre). This precinct has recently finished a $300 million redevelopment by the Casey Council, an entertainment precinct by the name of Bunjil Place.

See also
 City of Berwick – Narre Warren was previously within this former local government area.

References

Suburbs of Melbourne